The Anglo-Saxon Chronicle is a collection of annals in Old English, chronicling the history of the Anglo-Saxons. The original manuscript of the Chronicle was created late in the 9th century, probably in Wessex, during the reign of Alfred the Great (r. 871–899). Multiple copies were made of that one original and then distributed to monasteries across England, where they were independently updated. In one case, the Chronicle was still being actively updated in 1154.

Nine manuscripts survive in whole or in part, though not all are of equal historical value and none of them is the original version. The oldest seems to have been started towards the end of Alfred's reign, while the most recent was written at Peterborough Abbey after a fire at that monastery in 1116. Almost all of the material in the Chronicle is in the form of annals, by year; the earliest are dated at 60 BC (the annals' date for Caesar's invasions of Britain), and historical material follows up to the year in which the chronicle was written, at which point contemporary records begin. These manuscripts collectively are known as the Anglo-Saxon Chronicle.

The Chronicle is biased in places. There are occasions when comparison with other medieval sources makes it clear that the scribes who wrote it omitted events or told one-sided versions of stories. There are also places where the different versions contradict each other. Taken as a whole, however, the Chronicle is the single most important historical source for the period in England between the departure of the Romans and the decades following the Norman conquest. Much of the information given in the Chronicle is not recorded elsewhere. In addition, the manuscripts are important sources for the history of the English language; in particular, the later Peterborough text is one of the earliest examples of Middle English in existence.

Seven of the nine surviving manuscripts and fragments reside in the British Library. The other two are in the Bodleian Library at Oxford and the Parker Library of Corpus Christi College, Cambridge.

Composition
All of the surviving manuscripts are copies, so it is not known for certain where or when the first version of the Chronicle was composed. It is generally agreed that the original version – sometimes known as the Early English Annals – was written in the late 9th century by a scribe in Wessex. Frank Stenton argued from internal evidence that it was first compiled for a secular, but not royal, patron; and that "its origin is in one of the south-western shires...at some point not far from the boundary between Somerset and Dorset". After the original Chronicle was compiled, copies were made and distributed to various monasteries. Additional copies were made, for further distribution or to replace lost manuscripts, and some copies were updated independently of each other. Some of these later copies are those that have survived.

The earliest extant manuscript, the Parker Chronicle, was written by a single scribe up to the year 891. The scribe wrote the year number, DCCCXCII, in the margin of the next line; subsequent material was written by other scribes. This appears to place the composition of the chronicle at no later than 892; further evidence is provided by Bishop Asser's use of a version of the Chronicle in his work Life of King Alfred, known to have been composed in 893. It is known that the Winchester manuscript is at least two removes from the original Chronicle; as a result, there is no proof that the Chronicle was compiled at Winchester. It is also difficult to fix the date of composition, but it is generally thought that the chronicles were composed during the reign of Alfred the Great (871–99), as Alfred deliberately tried to revive learning and culture during his reign, and encouraged the use of English as a written language. The Chronicle, as well as the distribution of copies to other centres of learning, may be a consequence of the changes Alfred introduced.

Surviving manuscripts
Of the nine surviving manuscripts, seven are written entirely in Old English (also known as Anglo-Saxon). One, known as the Bilingual Canterbury Epitome, is in Old English with a translation of each annal into Latin. Another, the Peterborough Chronicle, is in Old English except for the last entry, which is in early Middle English. The oldest (Corp. Chris. MS 173) is known as the Winchester Chronicle or the Parker Chronicle (after Matthew Parker, an Archbishop of Canterbury, who once owned it), and is written in Old English until 1070, then Latin to 1075. Six of the manuscripts were printed in an 1861 edition for the Rolls Series by Benjamin Thorpe with the text laid out in columns labelled A to F. He also included the few readable remnants of a burned seventh manuscript, which he referred to as [G], partially destroyed in a fire at Ashburnham House in 1731. Following this convention, the two additional manuscripts are often called [H] and [I].

The surviving manuscripts are listed below; though manuscript G was burned in a fire in 1731, and only a few leaves remain.

Relationships between the manuscripts

The manuscripts are all thought to derive from a common original, but the connections between the texts are more complex than simple inheritance via copying. The diagram at right gives an overview of the relationships between the manuscripts. The following is a summary of the relationships that are known.
[A2] was a copy of [A], made in Winchester, probably between 1001 and 1013.
[B] was used in the compilation of [C] at Abingdon, in the mid-11th century. However, the scribe for [C] also had access to another version, which has not survived.
[D] includes material from Bede's Ecclesiastical History written by 731 and from a set of 8th-century Northumbrian annals and is thought to have been copied from a northern version that has not survived.
[E] has material that appears to derive from the same sources as [D] but does not include some additions that appear only in [D], such as the Mercian Register. This manuscript was composed at the monastery in Peterborough, some time after a fire there in 1116 that probably destroyed their copy of the Chronicle; [E] appears to have been created thereafter as a copy of a Kentish version, probably from Canterbury.
[F] appears to include material from the same Canterbury version that was used to create [E].
Asser's Life of King Alfred, which was written in 893, includes a translation of the Chronicle'''s entries from 849 to 887. Only [A], of surviving manuscripts, could have been in existence by 893, but there are places where Asser departs from the text in [A], so it is possible that Asser used a version that has not survived.
Æthelweard wrote a translation of the Chronicle, known as the Chronicon Æthelweardi, into Latin in the late 10th century; the version he used probably came from the same branch in the tree of relationships that [A] comes from.
Asser's text agrees with [A] and with Æthelweard's text in some places against the combined testimony of [B], [C], [D] and [E], implying that there is a common ancestor for the latter four manuscripts.
At Bury St Edmunds, some time between 1120 and 1140, an unknown author wrote a Latin chronicle known as the Annals of St Neots. This work includes material from a copy of the Chronicle, but it is very difficult to tell which version because the annalist was selective about his use of the material. It may have been a northern recension, or a Latin derivative of that recension.

All the manuscripts described above share a chronological error between the years 756 and 845, but it is apparent that the composer of the Annals of St Neots was using a copy that did not have this error and which must have preceded them. Æthelweard's copy did have the chronological error but it had not lost a whole sentence from annal 885; all the surviving manuscripts have lost this sentence. Hence the error and the missing sentence must have been introduced in separate copying steps, implying that none of the surviving manuscripts are closer than two removes from the original version.

History of the manuscripts
Winchester Chronicle

[A]: The Winchester (or Parker) Chronicle is the oldest manuscript of the Chronicle that survives. It was begun at Old Minster, Winchester, towards the end of Alfred's reign. The manuscript begins with a genealogy of Alfred, and the first chronicle entry is for the year 60 BC. The section containing the Chronicle takes up folios 1–32. Unlike the other manuscripts, [A] is of early enough composition to show entries dating back to the late 9th century in the hands of different scribes as the entries were made. The first scribe's hand is dateable to the late 9th or very early 10th century; his entries cease in late 891, and the following entries were made at intervals throughout the 10th century by several scribes. The eighth scribe wrote the annals for the years 925–955, and was clearly at Winchester when he wrote them since he adds some material related to events there; he also uses ceaster, or "city", to mean Winchester. The manuscript becomes independent of the other recensions after the entry for 975. The book, which also had a copy of the Laws of Alfred and Ine bound in after the entry for 924, was transferred to Canterbury some time in the early 11th century, as evidenced by a list of books that Archbishop Parker gave to Corpus Christi. While at Canterbury, some interpolations were made; this required some erasures in the manuscript. The additional entries appear to have been taken from a version of the manuscript from which [E] descends. The last entry in the vernacular is for 1070. After this comes the Latin Acta Lanfranci, which covers church events from 1070 to 1093. This is followed by a list of popes and the Archbishops of Canterbury to whom they sent the pallium. The manuscript was acquired by Matthew Parker, Archbishop of Canterbury (1559–1575) and is in the collection of the Parker Library, Corpus Christi College.

Abingdon Chronicle I
[B] The Abingdon Chronicle I was written by a single scribe in the second half of the 10th century. The Chronicle takes up folios 1–34. It begins with an entry for 60 BC and ends with the entry for 977. A manuscript that is now separate (British Library MS. Cotton Tiberius Aiii, f. 178) was originally the introduction to this chronicle; it contains a genealogy, as does [A], but extends it to the late 10th century. [B] was at Abingdon in the mid-11th century, because it was used in the composition of [C]. Shortly after this it went to Canterbury, where interpolations and corrections were made. As with [A], it ends with a list of popes and the archbishops of Canterbury to whom they sent the pallium.

Abingdon Chronicle II
[C] includes additional material from local annals at Abingdon, where it was composed. The section containing the Chronicle (folios 115–64) is preceded by King Alfred's Old English translation of Orosius's world history, followed by a menologium and some gnomic verses of the laws of the natural world and of humanity. Then follows a copy of the chronicle, beginning with 60 BC; the first scribe copied up to the entry for 490, and a second scribe took over up to the entry for 1048. [B] and [C] are identical between 491 and 652, but differences thereafter make it clear that the second scribe was also using another copy of the Chronicle. This scribe also inserted, after the annal for 915, the Mercian Register, which covers the years 902–924, and which focuses on Æthelflæd. The manuscript continues to 1066 and stops in the middle of the description of the Battle of Stamford Bridge. In the 12th century a few lines were added to complete the account.

Worcester Chronicle
[D] The Worcester Chronicle appears to have been written in the middle of the 11th century. After 1033 it includes some records from Worcester, so it is generally thought to have been composed there. Five different scribes can be identified for the entries up to 1054, after which it appears to have been worked on at intervals. The text includes material from Bede's Ecclesiastical History and from a set of 8th-century Northumbrian annals. It is thought that some of the entries may have been composed by Archbishop Wulfstan. [D] contains more information than other manuscripts on northern and Scottish affairs, and it has been speculated that it was a copy intended for the Anglicised Scottish court. From 972 to 1016, the sees of York and Worcester were both held by the same person—Oswald from 972, Ealdwulf from 992, and Wulfstan from 1003, and this may explain why a northern recension was to be found at Worcester. By the 16th century, parts of the manuscript were lost; eighteen pages were inserted containing substitute entries from other sources, including [A], [B], [C] and [E]. These pages were written by John Joscelyn, who was secretary to Matthew Parker.

Peterborough Chronicle

[E] The Peterborough Chronicle: In 1116, a fire at the monastery at Peterborough destroyed most of the buildings. The copy of the Chronicle kept there may have been lost at that time or later, but in either case shortly thereafter a fresh copy was made, apparently copied from a Kentish version—most likely to have been from Canterbury. The manuscript was written at one time and by a single scribe, down to the annal for 1121. The scribe added material relating to Peterborough Abbey which is not in other versions. The Canterbury original which he copied was similar, but not identical, to [D]: the Mercian Register does not appear, and a poem about the Battle of Brunanburh in 937, which appears in most of the other surviving copies of the Chronicle, is not recorded. The same scribe then continued the annals through to 1131; these entries were made at intervals, and thus are presumably contemporary records. Finally, a second scribe, in 1154, wrote an account of the years 1132–1154, though his dating is known to be unreliable. This last entry is in Middle English, rather than Old English. [E] was once owned by William Laud, Archbishop of Canterbury 1633–1645, so is also known as the Laud Chronicle. The manuscript contains occasional glosses in Latin, and is referred to (as "the Saxon storye of Peterborowe church") in an antiquarian book from 1566. According to Joscelyn, Nowell had a transcript of the manuscript. Previous owners include William Camden and William L'Isle; the latter probably passed the manuscript on to Laud.

Canterbury Bilingual Epitome
[F] The Canterbury Bilingual Epitome: In about 1100, a copy of the Chronicle was written at Christ Church, Canterbury, probably by one of the scribes who made notes in [A]. This version is written in both Old English and Latin; each entry in Old English was followed by the Latin version. The version the scribe copied (on folios 30–70) is similar to the version used by the scribe in Peterborough who wrote [E], though it seems to have been abridged. It includes the same introductory material as [D] and, along with [E], is one of the two chronicles that does not include the "Battle of Brunanburh" poem. The manuscript has many annotations and interlineations, some made by the original scribe and some by later scribes, including Robert Talbot.

Copy of the Winchester Chronicle
[A2]/[G] Copy of the Winchester Chronicle: [A2] was copied from [A] at Winchester in the eleventh century and follows a 10th-century copy of an Old English translation of Bede's Ecclesiastical History. The last annal copied was 1001, so the copy was made no earlier than that; an episcopal list appended to [A2] suggests that the copy was made by 1013. This manuscript was almost completely destroyed in the 1731 fire at Ashburnham House, where the Cotton Library was housed. Of the original 34 leaves, seven remain, ff. 39–47 in the manuscript. However, a transcript had been made by Laurence Nowell, a 16th-century antiquary, which was used by Abraham Wheelocke in an edition of the Chronicle printed in 1643. Because of this, it is also sometimes known as [W], after Wheelocke. Nowell's transcript copied the genealogical introduction detached from [B] (the page now British Library MS. Cotton Tiberius Aiii, f. 178), rather than that originally part of this document. The original [A2] introduction would later be removed prior to the fire and survives as British Library Add MS 34652, f. 2. The appellations [A], [A2] and [G] derive from Plummer, Smith and Thorpe, respectively.

Cottonian Fragment
The Cottonian Fragment [H] consists of a single leaf, containing annals for 1113 and 1114. In the entry for 1113 it includes the phrase "he came to Winchester"; hence it is thought likely that the manuscript was written at Winchester. There is not enough of this manuscript for reliable relationships to other manuscripts to be established. Ker notes that the entries may have been written contemporarily.

Easter Table Chronicle
[I] Easter Table Chronicle: A list of Chronicle entries accompanies a table of years, found on folios 133–37 in a badly burned manuscript containing miscellaneous notes on charms, the calculation of dates for church services, and annals pertaining to Christ Church, Canterbury. Most of the Chronicle's entries pertain to Christ Church, Canterbury. Until 1109 (the death of Anselm of Canterbury) they are in English; all but one of the following entries are in Latin. Part of [I] was written by a scribe soon after 1073, in the same hand and ink as the rest of the Caligula MS. After 1085, the annals are in various contemporary hands. The original annalist's entry for the Norman conquest is limited to "Her forðferde eadward kyng"; a later hand added the coming of William the Conqueror, "7 her com willelm." At one point this manuscript was at St Augustine's Abbey, Canterbury. See Caligula A.15, under "Provenance", which gives a description of the manuscript and some of its history.

Lost manuscripts
Two manuscripts are recorded in an old catalogue of the library of Durham; they are described as cronica duo Anglica. In addition, Parker included a manuscript called Hist. Angliae Saxonica in his gifts but the manuscript that included this, now Cambridge University Library MS. Hh.1.10, has lost 52 of its leaves, including all of this copy of the chronicle.

Sources, reliability and dating
The Chronicle incorporates material from multiple sources. The entry for 755, describing how Cynewulf took the kingship of Wessex from Sigebehrt, is far longer than the surrounding entries, and includes direct speech quotations from the participants in those events. It seems likely that this was taken by the scribe from existing saga material. Early entries, up to the year 110, probably came from one of the small encyclopedic volumes of world history in circulation at the time the Chronicle was first written. The chronological summary to Bede's Ecclesiastical History was used as a source. The Chronicle gives dates and genealogies for Northumbrian and Mercian kings, and provides a list of Wessex bishops; these are likely to have had separate sources. The entry for 661 records a battle fought by Cenwalh that is said to have been fought "at Easter"; this precision implies a contemporary record, which survived and was re-used by the Chronicle scribe.

Contemporary annals began to be kept in Wessex during the 7th century. The material compiled in Alfred's reign included annals relating to Kentish, South Saxon, Mercian and, particularly, West Saxon history, but, with the exception of the Cynewulf entry, does not gather momentum until it comes to the Nordic invasions of the late 8th century onwards. The Chronicle grew out of the tradition of the Easter Tables, drawn up to help the clergy determine the dates of feasts in future years: a page consisted of a sequence of horizontal lines followed by astronomical data, with a space for short notes of events to distinguish one year from another. As the Chronicle developed, it lost its list-like appearance, and such notes took up more space, becoming more like historical records. Many later entries, especially those written by contemporaries, contained a great deal of historical narrative under the year headings.

As with any historical source, the Chronicle has to be treated with some caution. For example, between 514 and 544 the Chronicle makes reference to Wihtgar, who is supposedly buried on the Isle of Wight at "Wihtgar's stronghold" (which is "Wihtgaræsbyrg" in the original) and purportedly gave his name to the island. However, the name of the "Isle of Wight" derives from the Latin "Vectis", not from Wihtgar. The actual name of the fortress was probably "Wihtwarabyrg", "the stronghold of the inhabitants of Wight", and either the chronicler or an earlier source misinterpreted this as referring to Wihtgar.Swanton, The Anglo-Saxon Chronicle, p. 16.

The dating of the events recorded also requires care. In addition to dates that are simply inaccurate, scribes occasionally made mistakes that caused further errors. For example, in the [D] manuscript, the scribe omits the year 1044 from the list on the left hand side. The annals copied down are therefore incorrect from 1045 to 1052, which has two entries. A more difficult problem is the question of the date at which a new year began, since the modern custom of starting the year on 1 January was not universal at that time. The entry for 1091 in [E] begins at Christmas and continues throughout the year; it is clear that this entry follows the old custom of starting the year at Christmas. Some other entries appear to begin the year on 25 March, such as the year 1044 in the [C] manuscript, which ends with Edward the Confessor's marriage on 23 January, while the entry for 22 April is recorded under 1045. There are also years which appear to start in September.

The manuscripts were produced in different places, and each manuscript reflects the biases of its scribes. It has been argued that the Chronicle should be regarded as propaganda, produced by Alfred's court and written with the intent of glorifying Alfred and creating loyalty. This is not universally accepted, but the origins of the manuscripts clearly colour both the description of interactions between Wessex and other kingdoms, and the descriptions of the Vikings' depredations. An example can be seen in the entry for 829, which describes Egbert's invasion of Northumbria. According to the Chronicle, after Egbert conquered Mercia and Essex, he became a "bretwalda", implying overlordship of all of England. Then when he marched into Northumbria, the Northumbrians offered him "submission and peace". The Northumbrian chronicles incorporated into Roger of Wendover's 13th-century history give a different picture: "When Egbert had obtained all the southern kingdoms, he led a large army into Northumbria, and laid waste that province with severe pillaging, and made King Eanred pay tribute."P. Wormald, "The Ninth Century", p. 139, in Campbell et al., The Anglo-Saxons.

Occasionally the scribes' biases can be seen by comparing different versions of the manuscript they created. For example, Ælfgar, earl of East Anglia, and son of Leofric, the earl of Mercia, was exiled briefly in 1055. The [C], [D] and [E] manuscripts say the following:Campbell et al., The Anglo-Saxons, p. 222.

 [C]: "Earl Ælfgar, son of Earl Leofric, was outlawed without any fault ..."
 [D]: "Earl Ælfgar, son of Earl Leofric, was outlawed well-nigh without fault ..."
 [E]: "Earl Ælfgar was outlawed because it was thrown at him that he was traitor to the king and all the people of the land. And he admitted this before all the men who were gathered there, although the words shot out against his will."

Another example that mentions Ælfgar shows a different kind of unreliability in the Chronicle: that of omission. Ælfgar was Earl of Mercia by 1058, and in that year was exiled again. This time only [D] has anything to say: "Here Earl Ælfgar was expelled, but he soon came back again, with violence, through the help of Gruffydd. And here came a raiding ship-army from Norway; it is tedious to tell how it all happened." In this case other sources exist to clarify the picture: a major Norwegian attempt was made on England, but [E] says nothing at all, and [D] scarcely mentions it. It has sometimes been argued that when the Chronicle is silent, other sources that report major events must be mistaken, but this example demonstrates that the Chronicle does omit important events.

Use by Latin and Anglo-Norman historians
The three main Anglo-Norman historians, John of Worcester, William of Malmesbury and Henry of Huntingdon, each had a copy of the Chronicle, which they adapted for their own purposes. Symeon of Durham also had a copy of the Chronicle. Some later medieval historians also used the Chronicle, and others took their material from those who had used it, and so the Chronicle became "central to the mainstream of English historical tradition".

Henry of Huntingdon used a copy of the Chronicle that was very similar to [E]. There is no evidence in his work of any of the entries in [E] after 1121, so although his manuscript may actually have been [E], it may also have been a copy—either one taken of [E] prior to the entries he makes no use of, or a manuscript from which [E] was copied, with the copying taking place prior to the date of the last annal he uses. Henry also made use of the [C] manuscript.

The Waverley Annals made use of a manuscript that was similar to [E], though it appears that it did not contain the entries focused on Peterborough. The manuscript of the chronicle translated by Geoffrey Gaimar cannot be identified accurately, though according to historian Dorothy Whitelock it was "a rather better text than 'E' or 'F'". Gaimar implies that there was a copy at Winchester in his day (the middle of the 12th century); Whitelock suggests that there is evidence that a manuscript that has not survived to the present day was at Winchester in the mid-tenth century. If it survived to Gaimar's time that would explain why [A] was not kept up to date, and why [A] could be given to the monastery at Canterbury.

John of Worcester's Chronicon ex chronicis appears to have had a manuscript that was either [A] or similar to it; he makes use of annals that do not appear in other versions, such as entries concerning Edward the Elder's campaigns and information about Winchester towards the end of the chronicle. His account is often similar to that of [D], though there is less attention paid to Margaret of Scotland, an identifying characteristic of [D]. He had the Mercian register, which appears only in [C] and [D]; and he includes material from annals 979–982 which only appears in [C]. It is possible he had a manuscript that was an ancestor of [D]. He also had sources which have not been identified, and some of his statements have no earlier surviving source.

A manuscript similar to [E] was available to William of Malmesbury, though it is unlikely to have been [E] as that manuscript is known to have still been in Peterborough after the time William was working, and he does not make use of any of the entries in [E] that are specifically related to Peterborough. It is likely he had either the original from which [E] was copied, or a copy of that original. He mentions that the chronicles do not give any information on the murder of Alfred Aetheling, but since this is covered in both [C] and [D] it is apparent he had no access to those manuscripts. On occasion he appears to show some knowledge of [D], but it is possible that his information was taken from John of Worcester's account. He also omits any reference to a battle fought by Cenwealh in 652; this battle is mentioned in [A], [B] and [C], but not in [E]. He does mention a battle fought by Cenwealh at Wirtgernesburg, which is not in any of the extant manuscripts, so it is possible he had a copy now lost.

Importance
The Anglo-Saxon Chronicle is the most important source for the history of England in Anglo-Saxon times. Without the Chronicle and Bede's Historia ecclesiastica gentis Anglorum (the Ecclesiastical History of the English People), it would be impossible to write the history of the English from the Romans to the Norman conquest; Nicholas Howe called them "the two great Anglo-Saxon works of history". It is clear that records and annals of some kind began to be kept in England at the time of the earliest spread of Christianity, but no such records survive in their original form. Instead they were incorporated in later works, and it is thought likely that the Chronicle contains many of these. The history it tells is not only that witnessed by its compilers, but also that recorded by earlier annalists, whose work is in many cases preserved nowhere else.

Its importance is not limited to the historical information it provides, however. It is just as important a source for the early development of English. The Peterborough Chronicle changes from the standard Old English literary language to early Middle English after 1131, providing some of the earliest Middle English text known. Howe notes, in "Rome: Capitol of Anglo-Saxon England", that many of the entries indicate that Rome was considered a spiritual home for the Anglo-Saxons, Rome and Roman history being of paramount importance in many of the entries; he cites the one for AD 1, for instance, which lists the reign of Octavian Augustus before it mentions the birth of Christ.

History of editions and availability
An important early printed edition of the Chronicle appeared in 1692, by Edmund Gibson, an English jurist and divine who later (1716) became Bishop of Lincoln. Titled Chronicon Saxonicum, it printed the Old English text in parallel columns with Gibson's own Latin version and became the standard edition until the 19th century. Gibson used three manuscripts of which the chief was the Peterborough Chronicle. It was superseded in 1861 by Benjamin Thorpe's Rolls Series edition, which printed six versions in columns, labelled A to F, thus giving the manuscripts the letters which are now used to refer to them.

John Earle wrote Two of the Saxon Chronicles Parallel (1865). Charles Plummer edited this book, producing a Revised Text with notes, appendices, and glossary in two volumes in 1892 and 1899.Whitelock, English Historical Documents, p. 129. This edition of the A and E texts, with material from other versions, was widely used; it was reprinted in 1952.

A facsimile edition of [A], The Parker Chronicle and Laws, appeared in 1941 from the Oxford University Press, edited by Robin Flower and Hugh Smith. The [C] manuscript had been edited by H. A. Rositzke as "The C-Text of the Old English Chronicles", in Beiträge zur Englischen Philologie, XXXIV, Bochum-Langendreer, 1940. A scholarly edition of the [D] manuscript is in An Anglo-Saxon Chronicle from British Museum Cotton MS., Tiberius B. iv, edited by E. Classen and F. E. Harmer, Manchester, 1926. Rositzke also published a translation of the [E] text in The Peterborough Chronicle (New York, 1951). The [F] text was printed in F. P. Magoun, Jr., Annales Domitiani Latini: an Edition in "Mediaeval Studies of the Pontifical Institute of Mediaeval Studies", IX, 1947, pp. 235–295. The first edition of [G] was Abraham Whelock's 1644 Venerabilis Bedae Historia Ecclesiastica, printed in Cambridge; there is also an edition by Angelica Lutz, Die Version G der angelsächsischen Chronik: Rekonstruktion und Edition (Munich, 1981).

Modern editions
The standard modern translations are by Dorothy Whitelock and Michael Swanton.

Beginning in the 1980s, a set of scholarly editions of the text in Old English have been printed under the series title "The Anglo-Saxon Chronicle: A Collaborative Edition". They are published by D. S. Brewer under the general editorship of David Dumville and Simon Keynes. As of 2021, the volumes published are:
1. Dumville, David ed., Anglo-Saxon Chronicle 1 MS F, facsimile edition, 2003
3. Bately, Janet ed., Anglo-Saxon Chronicle 3 MS A, 1986
4. Taylor, Simon ed., Anglo-Saxon Chronicle 4 MS B, 1983
5. O'Brien O'Keeffe, Katherine ed., Anglo-Saxon Chronicle 5 MS C, 2000
6. Cubbin, G. P. ed., Anglo-Saxon Chronicle 6 MS D, 1996
7. Irvine, Susan ed., Anglo-Saxon Chronicle: 7. MS E, 2004
8. Baker, Peter ed., Anglo-Saxon Chronicle 8 MS F, 2000
10. Conner, Patrick ed., Anglo-Saxon Chronicle 10 The Abingdon Chronicle AD 956-1066 (MS C with ref. to BDE), 1996
11. Dumville, David, Anglo-Saxon Chronicle 11 The Northern Recension, 2007
17. Dumville, David and Lapidge, Michael, Anglo-Saxon Chronicle 17 The annals of St Neots with Vita Prima Sancti Neoti, 1996

Notes

References

Sources
 
 
 
 
 
 
 

 

 
 

 
 

 

 

 Wormald, Patrick (1991). "The Ninth Century." In Campbell et al., The Anglo-Saxons, 132–159.
 

External links

 The Anglo-Saxon Chronicle at Project Gutenberg – Public domain copy.
The Chronicle from The Cambridge History of English and American Literature, Volume I, 1907–21.
 XML Edition of the Anglo-Saxon Chronicle by Tony Jebson.
 Digital images of Anglo-Saxon Chronicle A
 Digital images of Anglo-Saxon Chronicle B, C, D & F
 Digital images of Anglo-Saxon Chronicle E
 Published Wheelocke transcript of mostly-lost Anglo-Saxon Chronicle G
 Scans of introduction detached from Anglo-Saxon Chronicle G
 Scans of Anglo-Saxon Chronicle H
 Scans of Easter Table Chronicle (Anglo-Saxon Chronicle I, beginning at 135r)
 Several poems in versions of the Chronicle are edited, annotated and linked to digital images of their manuscript pages, with modern translations, in the Old English Poetry in Facsimile Project'': https://oepoetryfacsimile.org

English chronicles
Old English literature
Medieval English historians
Sources on Germanic paganism
Cotton Library